InterContinental Hotels & Resorts is a luxury hotel brand created in 1946 by Pan Am founder Juan Trippe. It has been part of UK-based InterContinental Hotels Group since 1998.  As of January 2023, there were 208 InterContinental hotels worldwide, with 70,287 rooms.

History

Early years

In 1945, U.S. President Franklin D. Roosevelt and Juan Trippe, President of Pan Am, discussed their concern for Latin America’s need for development dollars at a White House breakfast. The two men thought that one way to attract businessmen and tourists would be to offer luxury hotels in key cities. Trippe contacted Statler Hotels' chief executive H.B. Callis, and his company undertook a feasibility study, but the company decided the program would be too expensive. Trippe contacted multiple other US hotel chains, but none showed interest. Roosevelt requested that Pan Am take the lead in developing 5000 hotel rooms in Latin America, with a projected cost of $50,000,000. Pan Am's profit that year was only $3 million, so a $25,000,000 line of credit was arranged for Pan Am with the Export–Import Bank of the United States. Trippe agreed to form a subsidiary company to foster the implementation of the idea. The hotels would also serve to accommodate Pan Am crews and passengers in destinations where upscale hotels were not yet present. 

On 4 April 1946, the International Hotels Corporation was founded, with Pan Am owning a 100% stake. Throughout 1946, company executives traveled to cities across Latin America on fact-finding trips to scout potential locations. In early 1947, Pan Am decided that Intercontinental Hotels Corporation would more accurately reflect the chain's eventual global goals for expansion, and the company was renamed. The company signed its first lease that year, for the partially-completed Hotel Victoria Plaza in Montevideo, Uruguay. Construction there would end up continuing for more than five years. Throughout 1948 more locations were scouted, and in early 1949 agreements were signed for properties in Caracas and Maracaibo, Venezuela. On 1 May 1949, Intercontinental assumed operation of its first hotel, the 85-room Grande Hotel, in Belém, Brazil, which had been constructed in the early 20th Century.

On 1 January 1950, Intercontinental assumed operation of its second hotel, the Hotel Carrera, in Santiago, Chile. Over the next three years, the company took over three existing hotels – the Hotel del Prado in Barranquila, Colombia; the Hotel Reforma in Mexico City and The Princess in Hamilton, Bermuda. In 1953, Intercontinental opened three newly constructed properties – the Hotel Victoria Plaza in Montevideo, the Hotel Tamanaco in Caracas and the Hotel del Lago in Maracaibo. That same year, they also opened the Hotel Tequendama in Bogota, Colombia, the largest hotel in South America and the first hotel to be developed, designed and constructed completely under Intercontinental supervision. All four properties were designed by the Chicago firm of Holabird, Root & Burgee. In 1955, Intercontinental purchased a 47% stake in the Hotel Nacional de Cuba, in Havana. By 1958, the chain had sixteen hotels in operation throughout Latin America and the Caribbean.

Global Expansion

In 1961, Intercontinental Hotels opened its first property in the Middle East, the Phoenicia Intercontinental Beirut, in Lebanon. In 1962, the chain expanded to three more continents, assuming management of the Ducor Palace Hotel in Monrovia, Liberia in April, opening the Hotel Indonesia in Jakarta, Indonesia in July, and The Southern Cross in Melbourne, Australia in August. The first properties in Europe followed in May 1963, with simultaneous openings in Dublin, Cork and Limerick, Ireland. In 1964, Intercontinental became the first American hotel chain to operate in Eastern Europe, when it assumed management of the Hotel Esplanade in Zagreb, Yugoslavia. The chain would continue to be unique among American hospitality companies in operating behind the "Iron Curtain", opening properties in Budapest, Bucharest, Prague and Warsaw between 1968-1974. 

The company continued constructing new luxury hotels in Pan Am destinations around the world. In its hotel designs, Intercontinental aspired to combine Mid-century modern American luxury with decorative elements drawn from local cultures. Between 1961 and 1985, Intercontinental's head designer, Neal Prince, designed interiors and branding for 135 hotels.

The chain was officially rebranded as Inter•Continental Hotels in 1966, with the name commonly spelled with a hyphen as Inter-Continental when typed. 

In 1972, Inter-Continental started a line of moderately priced hotels, called Forum Hotels. The first Forum property was the Lee Gardens Hotel in Hong Kong. Inter-Continental opened its first hotel in the United States in 1973, when it assumed management of the Mark Hopkins Hotel in San Francisco.

Post-Pan Am era
Facing significant financial losses, Pan Am sold their profitable Inter-Continental Hotels division to Grand Metropolitan on 19 August 1981 for $500 million. On 1 April 1982, the new owners merged their existing chain of 17 Grand Metropolitan Hotels into Inter-Continental and its sibling chain Forum Hotels. 

Later in 1982, Inter-Continental formed a joint venture with Scanticon International, a Danish company that had opened a highly successful conference hotel near Princeton, New Jersey in 1981. Inter-Continental owned 80% of the business, with Scanticon controlling 20%. Scanticon conference hotels were opened in multiple locations in the US, before InterContinental exited the joint venture in 1991. 

Grand Metropolitan sold Inter-Continental Hotels to the Tokyo-based Seibu Saison Group on 1 October 1988 for $2.27 billion, for a profit of $850 million after taxes. On 20 February 1998, the Saison Group sold the chain to Bass PLC, for $2.9 billion. 

In 2000, Bass sold its namesake brewing business, along with its name and red triangle trademark, to Interbrew, for £2.3 billion. On 27 June 2001, Bass renamed itself Six Continents, focusing on its hotels and its 2000 restaurants and bars. The name Six Continents was chosen from among 10,000 staff submissions, and was already the name of the Inter-Continental Hotels loyalty club. In 2003, Six Continents demerged its bar and pubs business into a separate company, Mitchells & Butlers, and the hospitality company was renamed InterContinental Hotels Group. At the same time, Inter-Continental Hotels dropped the hyphen in its name and became InterContinental Hotels. The chain is one of numerous brands today within the company.

Notable properties
InterContinental Los Angeles Downtown, located within the Wilshire Grand Center in downtown Los Angeles, is the largest InterContinental in the Americas and the tallest building in Los Angeles.

The former InterContinental Davos is well-known for its modern architecture.

IHG managed the Willard InterContinental Hotel in downtown Washington, D.C., two blocks east of the White House. The -year-old hotel has hosted many heads of state.

The Inter-Continental Kabul opened in 1969, but ceased operation following the Soviet invasion of Afghanistan in 1979. The hotel continues to operate independently using the Inter-Continental name, but unaffiliated with the chain.

The former InterContinental Manila was a five-star hotel located on Ayala Avenue in Makati, Metro Manila, Philippines designed by Philippine National Artist Leandro Locsin. At the time of its opening in 1969, it was the first 5-star hotel in Makati and the second InterContinental hotel in Asia. At the time of its closure, it has become the longest operating international chain hotel in the Philippines. The landmark hotel was demolished in 2015 to be replaced by a new mixed-use development named after the hotel's iconic address, 1 Ayala Avenue.

Criticism

Food poisoning
In July 2016, InterContinental Adelaide was responsible for giving at least 70 diners salmonella food poisoning. Twenty-one of these people had to be treated at hospital.

Hygiene standards
In September 2017, a consumer rights group accused InterContinental Beijing Sanlitun of substandard hygiene conditions. Specifically during an undercover operation they had marked bed linen and toilets with an invisible stamp. Upon returning the next day the marks were still there.

References

External links

InterContinental Hotels & Resorts

 
Hotel chains in the United States
Hotels established in 1946
InterContinental Hotels Group brands
Pan Am